The Shinn Curtis Log House lies in the heart of a historic section of Mount Holly, New Jersey, United States. The early settler's home of hand-hewn logs originally built in 1712 was encased in a house and was uncovered in 1967 when the surrounding house was demolished. It was in the possession of the Curtis family for 147 years, since 1802, and is now owned by the Mount Holly Historical Society. The building was relocated from what had been Water Street and renamed Rancocas Road.

See also
 National Register of Historic Places listings in Burlington County, New Jersey
 List of the oldest buildings in New Jersey

References 

MountHollyHistoricalSociety.org

Houses in Burlington County, New Jersey
Houses completed in 1712
Log cabins in the United States
Mount Holly, New Jersey
1712 establishments in New Jersey
Log buildings and structures on the National Register of Historic Places in New Jersey